is a Japanese actress and glamour model. She is married to the director Sion Sono and has starred in some of his films.

Career
Kagurazaka has appeared in films such as Cold Fish, Guilty of Romance, and The Land of Hope.

Filmography

Films
 Into the Faraway Sky (2007)
 Gakkō no kaidan (2007) as Noriko Mamiya
 Hanky-Panky Baby (2008)
 Spy Girl's Mission Cord #005 (2008)
 Dotei Horoki (2009)
 Pride (2009) as Morita
 Oyasumi Ammonite (2010)
 The Parasite Doctor Suzune: Genesis x Evolution (2011) as Naomi
 Guilty of Romance (2011) as Izumi Kikuchi
 Cold Fish (2011) as Yōko Takamura
 The Land of Hope (2012) as Izumi
 Himizu (2012) as Keiko Tamura
 The Incredible Truth (2013)
 Why Don't You Play in Hell? (2013) as Junko
 The Whispering Star (2015)
 The Virgin Psychics (2015) as Akiyama Takako
 Tokyo Vampire Hotel (2017)

Television
 Shiawase no Jikan (2012) Yōko Takamura
 Minna! ESPer Dayo! (2013) as Akiyama Takako
 All Esper Dayo! SP (2015) (television special) as Akiyama Takako

References

External links
 

1981 births
Japanese film actresses
Living people
Actors from Okayama Prefecture
Japanese female adult models
Japanese gravure idols
Japanese television personalities